The Westphalian State Museum of Art and Cultural History (LWL-Landesmuseum für Kunst und Kulturgeschichte)
is an arts and cultural museum in Münster, Germany Besides an extensive collection ranging from spätgotik painting and sculpture to the Cranachs, the museum specializes in paintings from the Der Blaue Reiter and Die Brücke movements, in particular works by August Macke.

References

External links
LWL-Landesmuseum official website 

Art museums and galleries in Germany
Museums in Münster